Elżbieta Maria Barszczewska-Wyrzykowska (29 November 1913 – 14 October 1987) was a Polish stage and film actress.

After graduating Państwowy Instytut Sztuki Teatralnej, she debuted in Polish Theatre in Warsaw in 1934. She also starred in several movie roles, including 13 major ones. In occupied Poland, she took part in the activities of the underground theater. After the war she resumed work with the Polish Theater and the National Theatre. She was a mother of Juliusz Wyrzykowski.

Selected filmography
 Trędowata (1936)
 Pan Twardowski (1936)
 Znachor (1937)
 Dziewczęta z Nowolipek
 Ostatnia brygada (1938)
 Profesor Wilczur
 Kościuszko pod Racławicami
 Granica
 The Three Hearts (1939)
 Kłamstwo Krystyny
 Geniusz sceny
 Rytm serca (1977)

External links

 

1913 births
1987 deaths
Actresses from Warsaw
People from Warsaw Governorate
Polish actresses
Recipients of the Order of the Banner of Work
20th-century Polish actresses
Polish stage actresses
Polish film actresses
Recipients of the Cross of Merit (Poland)
Recipient of the Meritorious Activist of Culture badge